HMS Eastbourne was a Whitby-class, or Type 12, anti-submarine frigate of the Royal Navy of the United Kingdom.

Design
The Whitbys were designed as specialist anti-submarine warships, intended to counter fast modern diesel-electric submarines. To meet these requirements, the Type 12s had a new hull form and, unlike the contemporary Type 41 anti-aircraft and Type 61 air direction frigates, were powered by steam turbines.

The ships were powered by the new Y-100 machinery in which the ship's boilers and steam turbines were designed as a closely integrated set of machinery to increase efficiency. Crew was about 189 when operated as a leader and 152 as an ordinary ship.

A twin 4.5-inch (113 mm) Mark 6 gun mount was fitted forward, with 350 rounds of ammunition carried, with close-in armament of a stabilised STAAG (Stabilised Tachymetric Anti-Aircraft Gun) twin Bofors 40 mm L/60 gun mount aft. The design anti-submarine armament consisted of twelve 21-inch torpedo-tubes (eight fixed and two twin rotating mounts) for Mark 20E Bidder homing anti-submarine torpedoes, backed up by two Limbo anti-submarine mortars fitted aft. The Bidder homing torpedoes proved unsuccessful however, being too slow to catch modern submarines, and the torpedo tubes were soon removed.

The ship was fitted with a Type 293Q surface/air search radar on the foremast, with a Type 277 height-finding radar on a short mast forward of the foremast. A Mark 6M fire control system (including a Type 275 radar) for the 4.5 inch guns was mounted above the ship's bridge, while a Type 974 navigation radar was also fitted. The ship's sonar fit consisted of Type 174 search, Type 170 fire control sonar for Limbo and a Type 162 sonar for classifying targets on the sea floor.

Construction
Eastbourne was laid down at Vickers Armstrongs Newcastle upon Tyne shipyard on 13 January 1951 and was launched on 29 December 1955. The ship was being fitted out when on 20 February 1956 a fire broke out on board, killing three men, while a dockyard ship manager, Richard Joicey, was awarded the George Medal for rescuing four trapped workers. Construction continued at Vickers Armstrongs' Barrow-in-Furness shipyard, and Eastbourne was completed on 9 January 1958.

Operational service
 
On commissioning Eastbourne joined the 3rd Training Squadron, based at Londonderry Port, Northern Ireland. In August that year, she was loaned to the Fishery Protection Squadron. Eastbourne carried the flag of Commodore, Fishery Protection Squadron (CFPS) in the First Cod War, off Iceland. In June 1959, Eastbourne joined the 4th Frigate Squadron, serving in Home waters and the Mediterranean. In 1966 she was the leader of the Dartmouth Training Squadron.

During their 14 weeks aboard ship, the apprentices were trained in general engineering and were examined for their auxiliary machinery certificates. She also took part in the Royal Navy's Fleet Review in celebration of HM the Queen's Silver Jubilee.

Harbour training ship 

In 1976 Eastbourne was dispatched to Iceland to assist in the third Cod War and on 22 May she was damaged in a collision with the ICGV Baldur. During the subsequent repairs in Rosyth in 1977, a hull inspection found that Eastbourne was no longer fit for sea, though her machinery was still in good condition. Her propellers were removed, and 'brake wheels' were fitted as a replacement. This enabled her to be steamed at full power with no forward movement. This enabled the apprentices to assist in operation of her machinery at full power, with the added benefit of churning the dockyard basin water up to improve its aeration. Officers under training from Royal Naval Engineering College Manadon were also able to be trained onboard before their first sea draft.

In the 1980s, Eastbourne remained moored at Rosyth Dockyard alongside  as harbour training ship for the marine engineering artificer apprentices of Caledonia. Once Caledonia was scheduled to close, both Eastbourne and Duncan were de-stored and paid off for disposal in March 1984.

References

Publications
 
 
 
 

 
 
 

 

Whitby-class frigates
Ships built in Barrow-in-Furness
1955 ships
Ships of the Fishery Protection Squadron of the United Kingdom
Maritime incidents in 1976
Ships built on the River Tyne
Ships built by Vickers Armstrong